Euryops brownei is a woody herb or shrub of ½–3 m (1⅔–10 ft) high, with yellow flowerheads of both ray and disc florets, and small, narrow leaves, belonging to the daisy family. The species is native to the highlands of northern Tanzania and central Kenya.

Description 
Euryops brownei is a woody herb or shrub of ½–3 m (1⅔–10 ft) high.

Stems and leaves 
This plant has initially green but eventually blackish stems that show leaf-scars when the bases of the dead leaves have fallen. The light green leaves are set densely along the stem. They do not have a petiole, are linear in shape, 1–3¼ cm (0.4–1.3 in) long, 1–2½ mm (0.04–0.1 in) wide, a little bit narrowed above a wider and membraneous base, entire or with minute saw teeth, with a blunt tip, and a row of short hairs on the margins near the base, otherwise without hair.

Inflorescences and fruits 
The plants are rich in flower heads, which stand in the higher leaf axils on their own stem (peduncle) of ¾–4½ cm (0.03–0.18 in) long, with few hairs or densely woolly. The involucres are woolly at their base, and consist of thirteen to sixteen ovate or ovate-lanceolate bracts of 4½–6½ mm (0.18–0.26 in) long, fused with each other for the lower half or third, with a blunt or pointy tip, and short hairs at the tip. Each flower head consists of mostly thirteen (full range eleven to twenty one) bright yellow ray florets of 1–1½ cm (0.4–0.6 in) long and 2⅔–4 mm (0.11–0.16 in) wide on the outside and many yellow disc florets of 2¼–4 mm long. The indehiscent, one-seeded fruits (called cypselas) are oblong in shape, 2½–4½ mm (0.10–0.18 in) long, with five to eight ribs, without or with some short hairs, and topped with a pappus that consists of bristles of 1–2½ mm (0.04–0.1 in) long.

Taxonomy 
Euryops brownei was first described by Spencer Le Marchant Moore in 1916, based on a plant collected by Browne on Mount Kenya in 1914, now at the Natural History Museum, London. Johannes Mattfeld described Euryops agrianthoides in 1924 based on a collection from Mount Meru by Uhlig. Robert Elias Fries considered a plant he collected in the Aberdare Range at Sattima to be sufficiently different to distinguish it as Euryops brownei subsp. aberdarica in 1928. All these names are now considered synonyms.

Distribution 

Ecology 
Euryops brownei can amongst elsewhere be found in the lower alpine zone of Mount Kenya, where it grows together with the shrubs Adenocarpus mannii, Anthospermum usambarense, Helichrysum chionoides, Phillippia excelsa, Protea kilimandscharica and Struthiola thomsonii, grasses Deschampsia flexuosa and Pentaschistis minor, herbs Dierama cupuliflorum, Gladiolus watsonioides, Alepidea massaica, among others.

References 

brownei
Flora of East Tropical Africa
Plants described in 1916